Aleksandr Valentinovich Ryabov (born 22 December 1975) is a Russian sprinter. He competed in the men's 200 metres at the 2000 Summer Olympics.

References

1975 births
Living people
Athletes (track and field) at the 2000 Summer Olympics
Athletes (track and field) at the 2004 Summer Olympics
Russian male sprinters
Olympic athletes of Russia
Sportspeople from Tolyatti
Universiade silver medalists for Russia
Universiade medalists in athletics (track and field)
Medalists at the 2003 Summer Universiade
21st-century Russian people